Saksayam Chidchob (born 9 November 1962) is a Thai politician.  he serves as Minister of Transport in the second cabinet of Prime Minister Prayut Chan-o-cha.

Early life and education
Saksayam born on 9 November 1962 in Surin Province, He is the son of former Speakers of the House of Representatives Chai Chidchob and La-ong Chidchob and also younger brother of Newin Chidchob. He completed secondary education from Suankularb Wittayalai School and then Bachelor in Political Science from Thammasat University in 1984 and a Master's degree in Political Science from the National Institute of Development Administration in 1988.

Careers
Saksayam used to serve in the position of Deputy District Chief under the Department of Provincial Administration, Ministry of Interior. Later he ran for election as a member of the House of Representatives in 2001 and 2005. Then he was appointed as Chairman of the Working Group of the minister of interior Kowit Wattana. Later in 2007, his political rights were disqualified for five years as the executive director of the Thai Rak Thai Party, which was dissolved in the 2006 dissolution of political parties.

In the government of Abhisit Vejjajiva, He was appointed Chairman of the Working Group of Minister of Interior Chavarat Charnvirakul on 17 September 2009.

Saksayam has applied to be a member of the Bhumjaithai Party in 2012 after the expiration of the political rights disqualification and was elected as Secretary-General of the Bhumjaithai Party on October 14, 2012.

In the government of Prayut Chan-o-cha was appointed Minister of Transport.

Personal life
On 7 April 2021, Saksayam tested positive for COVID-19. He was the first Thai cabinet minister to be infected with COVID-19.

Royal decorations 
Saksayam has received the following royal decorations in the Honours System of Thailand:
  Knight Grand Cordon (Special Class) of The Most Noble Order of the Crown of Thailand
  Knight Grand Cross (First Class) of The Most Noble Order of the White Elephant
  2nd Class 2nd Cat of Freeman Safeguarding Medal
  Border Service Medal

References 

Living people
1962 births
Saksayam Chidchob
Saksayam Chidchob
Saksayam Chidchob
Saksayam Chidchob